Hugh Jeffrey Treadway (born January 22, 1963) is an American former professional baseball second baseman. He played in Major League Baseball (MLB) for the Cincinnati Reds, Atlanta Braves, Cleveland Indians, Los Angeles Dodgers, and Montreal Expos between 1987 and 1995. Due to injuries leading to shoulder and hand surgeries as well as position battles, he only averaged 84 games per year. His career batting average was .281. His postseason hitting was clutch, in just 8 games he had 11 at bats with 4 hits and a walk for an OPS of .780. Both Atlanta World Series appearances he played in finished with losses, in 1991 to the Twins and in 1992 to the Blue Jays.

Treadway was born in Columbus, Georgia, and started his MLB career in 1987 with the team that signed him undrafted, the Cincinnati Reds. He was traded / sold at the end of spring training in 1989 to the Atlanta Braves. His full-time role lasted there lasted two and a half years before Mark Lemke started to take over second base duties.
By far the biggest offensive highlight of his career came on May 28, 1990. It was in Veteran's Stadium in Philadelphia on the night the Phillies were retiring future Hall Of Famer Mike Schmidt's number. Treadway hit three home runs that night off three different pitchers. There was one more full season of part-time play in 1992 for Atlanta before being released at the end of the season.

Within a month he was signed by the Cleveland Indians. His full season of play for the Tribe meant him playing more games at third base than second. He was granted free agency at the end of the 1993 season.

In late 1993 the Los Angeles Dodgers signed Treadway, where he played an even mix of second and third base until May of the 1995 season. He was then traded to the team that had originally tried to draft him out of high school, the Montreal Expos. 41 games and 55 at bats there were his final as a major leaguer. He announced his retirement on September 16, 1995.

Treadway attended the University of Georgia and played baseball for the Bulldogs from 1982 to 1983.

He is one of the few major leaguers to have successfully completed the hidden ball trick, accomplishing it at least twice.

After leaving major league baseball, Treadway managed the minor league Macon Braves for two seasons starting in 1999.  He then joined the staff of Stratford Academy in 2003, where he has managed the Macon, Georgia-based high school baseball and softball programs.  He led the baseball team to the GISA State Championship in 2007 and the fast-pitch softball team to GISA state championships in 2009, 2010, 2011, and 2012. As of 2022, he is an assistant baseball coach at Stratford.

References

External links

 Baseball almanac

1963 births
Living people
American expatriate baseball players in Canada
Atlanta Braves players
Baseball players from Columbus, Georgia
Cincinnati Reds players
Cleveland Indians players
Denver Zephyrs players
Georgia Bulldogs baseball players
Greenville Braves players
Los Angeles Dodgers players
Major League Baseball second basemen
Middle Georgia Warriors baseball players
Minor league baseball managers
Montreal Expos players
Nashville Sounds players
Tampa Tarpons (1957–1987) players
Vermont Reds players
Peninsula Oilers players